Sergei Valeryevich Yeliseyev (born 28 May 1972) is a former Russian football player.

References

1972 births
Living people
Soviet footballers
Russian footballers
FC Tyumen players
Russian Premier League players
FC Shinnik Yaroslavl players
FC Rubin Kazan players
FC Spartak Kostroma players
FC Yugra Nizhnevartovsk players
PFC CSKA Moscow players
Association football forwards 
Association football midfielders